David and Marc were two Eastern Christians who were sent as ambassadors to the French king Louis IX by the Mongols in 1248. David is also known by his Arab name Saif al-Din Muzaffar Dawaud. David and Marc were first met by André de Longjumeau in 1245 in Tabriz, during his mission to the Mongol realm.

Embassy to King Louis
Little is known about the envoys except for their mission. In 1248, the two men were sent by the Mongol general Eljigidei, acting on behalf of the Khan  Güyük, to meet with Louis IX on Cyprus. King Louis had arrived on the island on November 17, 1248, making preparation for his Crusade. The two envoys met with him on December 20. The speed of their arrival is perhaps because they had been informed of Louis’ journey beforehand, as he had left from Aigues-Mortes on August 25, 1248. They claimed they had received the information from the sultan of Mossoul. The envoys also met with the Papal legate Eudes de Chateauroux.

The two envoys brought with them a missive to Louis from Khan Güyük . This letter contrasted with earlier Mongol letters, which had been filled with contempt and demands for submission. However, Güyük's letter called Louis "the great king" ("maximus rex"), and wished him the best for his battles against the Muslims. Güyük  also asked Louis to respect all the Christian faiths present in the Orient:

David and Marc claimed that Güyük had been converted to Christianity with 18 other princes by "Bishop Malassias" and that Eljigedei had already been Christian for a long time.

After celebrating Christmas together, David and Marc had a final interview with the king on January 25, 1249. They left on the 26th, together with the seven French envoys led by King Louis' envoy, André de Longjumeau. The group included two other Dominican friars, Jean de Carcassonne and Andre’s brother Guillaume de Longjumeau; two clerks Jehanz Godriche and Robert de Poissy; and two officers Gilbert de Sens and Herberz le Sommelierz. A more or less independent clerk named Theodule d’Acre would also join the group, and later visit Karakorum. They carried rich presents from the king of France to the Mongol ruler: a scarlet tent-chapel with an embroidered scene of the life of Christ, and precious parcels of the cross of Jesus Christ.

From Antioch or Saint-Jean d'Acre to Central Asia, the group is known to have travelled under a Mongol guard using the "admirably organized" Mongol imperial post.

See also
Christianity among the Mongols

Notes

References
 Roux, Jean-Paul, Les explorateurs au Moyen-Age, Fayard, 1985, 

Christians of the Crusades
Mongol Empire Christians
13th-century diplomats
Ambassadors to the Mongol Empire